Gorm's Cup, also known as the Jelling Cup, is a small silver cup buried with the Danish king Gorm the Old, .

Context 
The cup was found in the huge double barrow in which the heathen king Gorm the Old, founder of the Danish monarchy, and his Christian wife Thyra, were buried side by side at Jelling at Jutland. According to heathen custom the corpses were laid in the royal grave upon pillows filled with down, with wax candles at their sides.  

In the barrow was also found a curious figure of Christ. The figure is of wood; it represents Christ, but is surrounded by the triskele, the old symbol of Woden. On the large stones, erected, according to heathen custom, above the barrows, a figure of Christ is seen surrounded by the same heathen triskele.

Interpretation 
The cup is of silver, gilt inside, and ornamented with an old half mythological pattern of twisted snakes and fantastic animals. The burial-chamber was almost certainly closed in 958 or 959: which was no more than seven years before Denmark was officially Christianised, according to the Saxon chronicler Widukind of Corvey. The small silver cup from the grave has been interpreted by some scholars as a Christian chalice, but others have thought it a drinking vessel for the alcoholic beverage called beor.

See also 

 Viking art
 Animal style
 Christianisation of Scandinavia

References 

10th-century works
Viking art